Joseph Weyland (born 24 April 1943) is a Luxembourgian diplomat and was Luxembourg's Ambassador to the United States from 2 March 2005 to 2008.  In addition, he was concurrently accredited to Canada, Mexico, and the Organization of American States (OAS). He had previously been Permanent Representative to the United Nations in New York (1983 – 84), Permanent Representative to the European Union (1984 – 91), Ambassador to the United Kingdom (1993 – 2002), and Permanent Representative to NATO (2003 – 05).

Honours
He is a recipient of numerous decorations, including:
 Luxembourg:
 Order of Merit (Grand Officer)
 Order of the Oak Crown (Commander)
 France: Légion d'honneur (Commander)

Footnotes

External links 
 The Washington Diplomat Newspaper - Ambassador Profile 

|-

Luxembourgian diplomats
Sciences Po alumni
1943 births
Living people
Grand Officers of the Order of Merit of the Grand Duchy of Luxembourg
Commandeurs of the Légion d'honneur
Ambassadors of Luxembourg to the United States
Ambassadors of Luxembourg to Canada
Ambassadors of Luxembourg to Mexico
Ambassadors of Luxembourg to the United Kingdom
Permanent Representatives to the European Union
Permanent Representatives of Luxembourg to the United Nations
Permanent Representatives of Luxembourg to NATO
Permanent Representatives of Luxembourg to the Organization of American States
Officers of the Order of Merit of the Grand Duchy of Luxembourg
Luxembourgian officials of the European Union